Women's football in Pakistan is growing in popularity.

One the barriers of the sport growing is it coached by men so the Pakistan FA are trying to get more women involved in coaching and refereeing.

The first club to be established was Diya W.F.C. in 2002, while the first edition of National Women Football Championship was held three years later.

National-level tournaments
Two national level tournaments are organised by Pakistan Football Federation (PFF). These are the Inter-Club Championships and National Women Football Championship. An under-16 championship and under-19 championship have also been organised.

Inter-Club Championship
The National Inter-Club Women Football Championship was organised to provide competition to the country's club teams. It purposely excludes all departmental teams. So far, 6 editions have been held with the last one in 2014.

National Women Football Championship
The National Women Football Championship was first organised in 2005. Since then, a total of 13 editions have been organised with both clubs and departmental teams (including Army, WAPDA and HEC) participating in it. Rawalpindi-based Young Rising Stars has won the most titles (5), with four consecutive wins between 2010 and 2013. WAPDA has reached the most finals (7), winning once. From the 12th edition, the competition is being live streamed by MyCujoo.

Performance by club

 g Guest teams invited by PFF: Afghanistan represented Afghanistan and Malavan BA represented Iran.

Teams 
The following clubs and provincial, city-based and departmental teams have played in the Inter-Club Championship and/or NWFC at least once since these tournaments were established.

See also
Football in Pakistan
Pakistan women's national football team

References 

 
Football in Pakistan